The following is a list of pay television networks broadcasting or receivable in the United States, organized by broadcast area and genre.

Some television providers use one or more channel slots for east/west feeds, high definition services, secondary audio programming and access to video on demand.

Not all channels are available on all providers and some are also available on free-to-air stations.

This list may be incomplete and uses limited sources relative to the 2,675 TV providers in the United States.

National channels 
The following channels are available on pay TV systems across the United States.

English Language

Spanish Language

Regional channels 
The following channels are only available in certain regions as noted; they are all primarily broadcast in English;

Distant locals 
The following channels are distant locals, sold out-of-market to areas without a relevant affiliate:

International

Radio channels 
The following are audio-only channels available to pay TV users; some channels use freeze frame television to display information on screen:

Defunct networks

See also 

 Cable television in the United States
 High-definition television in the United States
 Satellite television in the United States
 Television in the United States

 Lists
 List of Canadian television stations available in the United States
 List of Defunct TV Channels in the United States
 List of television stations in the United States
 List of United States over-the-air television networks
 List of United States stations available in Canada
 List of United States television markets
 Streaming service

References

2
Television networks, cable and satellite